Qezel Dizaj (also Romanized as Qezel Dīzaj; also known as Ghezel Dizaj, Kyzyl-Diza, Qezel Dīzeh, and Qizil Dīzeh) is a village in Aji Chay Rural District, in the Central District of Tabriz County, East Azerbaijan Province, Iran. At the 2006 census, its population was 1,333, in 231 families.

References 

Populated places in Tabriz County